Pursuant to Article 46 of the Law on Internal Regulations of the Islamic Consultative Assembly (Parliament of the Islamic Republic of Iran), the Education, Research and Technology Commission of the Islamic Consultative Assembly shall be formed in accordance with the provisions of the regulations to perform its assigned duties in the areas of general education, technical and vocational education, higher education and research and technology matters in the Islamic Republic of Iran.

Some of the responsibilities of this commission are:

 Proposing appropriate laws and bills for the country's educational, technological and research field in the parliament
 Review the competencies and plans of the proposed ministers in the fields of education, research and technology
 Review of general educational plans and programs for schools and universities in the country
 Reviewing the educational laws of the country and resolving contradictions by issuing amendments
 Reviewing the educational budget of the country and following up on the rights of employees in the fields of education, research and technology
 Reviewing the plans related to the employment situation in the educational field of the country with the cooperation of the relevant officials and agencies
 Review and provide solutions to the country's challenges in the fields of education, research and technology
 Provide solutions for the protection of Iranian culture and national identity in the fields of education, research and technology

Members 
The members of the Education, Research and Technology Commission of the Islamic Consultative Assembly in the second year of the 11th term of the Assembly are as follows:

See also 
 Program, Budget and Accounting Commission of the Islamic Consultative Assembly
 Health and Medical Commission of the Islamic Consultative Assembly
 Internal Affairs of the Country and Councils Commission of the Islamic Consultative Assembly
 Integration Commission of the Islamic Consultative Assembly
 Joint Commission of the Islamic Consultative Assembly
 Special Commission of the Islamic Consultative Assembly
 Social Commission of the Islamic Consultative Assembly
 The history of the parliament in Iran

References

Committees of the Iranian Parliament
Islamic Consultative Assembly